The voiced alveolar lateral flap is a type of consonantal sound, used in some spoken languages.

Some languages that are described as having a lateral flap actually have a flap that is indeterminate with respect to centrality, and may surface as either central or lateral, either in free variation or allophonically depending on surrounding vowels and consonants.

Features
Features of the voiced alveolar lateral flap:

Occurrence

Dental

Alveolar

See also
Index of phonetics articles
Perception of English /r/ and /l/ by Japanese speakers

Notes

References

External links
 

Alveolar consonants
Lateral consonants
Tap and flap consonants
Pulmonic consonants
Oral consonants